The Republic of India officially recognized Montenegro on August 2, 2006, when they established diplomatic relations between the two countries. 
India is represented in Montenegro through its embassy in Vienna, Austria. India also has an honorary consulate in Podgorica

Economic relations
In 2012, the total trade between the two countries amounted to 7,054,099 euros.

See also
 India–Yugoslavia relations
 Yugoslavia and the Non-Aligned Movement

References

Montenegro
Bilateral relations of Montenegro